"Twenty Years and Two Husbands Ago" is a song co-written and recorded by American country music artist Lee Ann Womack.  It was released in November 2005 as the third single from the album There's More Where That Came From.  The song reached #32 on the Billboard Hot Country Songs chart.  The song was written by Womack, Dean Dillon and Dale Dodson.

Chart performance

References

2005 singles
2005 songs
Lee Ann Womack songs
Songs written by Dean Dillon
Song recordings produced by Byron Gallimore
MCA Nashville Records singles
Songs written by Lee Ann Womack